A concert hall is a cultural building with a stage that serves as a performance venue and an auditorium filled with seats.

This list does not include other venues such as sports stadia, dramatic theatres or convention centres that may occasionally be used for concerts.

The list is organised alphabetically by geo-political region or continent and then by country within each region.

Africa

Egypt

Morocco

South Africa

Asia

Armenia

Azerbaijan

China

Georgia

Hong Kong

India

Iran

Israel

Indonesia

Japan

Kazakhstan

Lebanon

Macau

Malaysia

North Korea

Oman

Philippines

Singapore

South Korea

Syria

Taiwan

Thailand

Turkey

Vietnam

Europe

Albania

Austria

Belgium

Bulgaria

Croatia

Czech Republic

Denmark

Estonia

Finland

France

Germany

Greece

Hungary

Iceland

Ireland (Republic of)

Italy

Latvia

Luxembourg

Netherlands

Norway

Poland

Portugal

Romania

Russia

Serbia

Slovakia

Slovenia

Spain

Sweden

Switzerland

Ukraine

United Kingdom

North America and the Caribbean

Canada

Dominican Republic

Mexico

Puerto Rico

Trinidad and Tobago

United States

Alabama–Arkansas

California

Colorado–District of Columbia

Florida

Georgia–Hawaii

Idaho–Iowa

Kansas–Louisiana

Maine–Massachusetts

Michigan

Minnesota

Mississippi-Montana

Nebraska–New Mexico

New York

See also Broadway theatre for a listing of the theatres that support Broadway shows.

North Carolina–North Dakota

Ohio

Oklahoma–Oregon

Pennsylvania-Rhode Island

South Carolina–Tennessee

Texas

Utah–Virginia

Washington–Wisconsin

Oceania

Australia

New Zealand

South and Central America

Argentina

Bolivia

Brazil

Chile

Colombia

Ecuador

Peru

Uruguay

Venezuela

Industry associations
International Association of Venue Managers
World Council for Venue Management

See also
Big Five (orchestras)
Concert Hall Acoustics
List of buildings and structures
List of concert venues
List of contemporary amphitheatres
List of jazz clubs
List of opera houses
List of symphony orchestras
Noise mitigation

References

External links

Concert halls
Classical music lists
Lists of music venues